Robi Jakovljević (born 7 May 1993) is a Slovenian footballer who plays for Radomlje in the Slovenian PrvaLiga.

References

External links
PrvaLiga profile 

1993 births
Living people
Slovenian footballers
Association football midfielders
ND Gorica players
NK Brda players
NK Radomlje players
Slovenian PrvaLiga players
Slovenian Second League players
Slovenia youth international footballers